State Highway 11A (West Bengal) is a state highway in West Bengal, India.

Route
SH 11A originates from Bhagawangola and passes through Lalgola, Teghari, Jangipur and terminates at Raghunathganj. 

The total length of SH 11A is 65 km.

See also
List of state highways in West Bengal

References

State Highways in West Bengal